Megasyrphus erraticus is a Holarctic species of hoverfly associated with mature conifer woodlands and plantations.

Description
External images
For terms see Morphology of Diptera 
M. erraticus is a large (10–15 mm. wing length) wasp mimic with a yellow pattern. The thoracic dorsum is blackish and shiny, in contrast to the greenish dorsum of most species of Syrphus and Epistrophe. Without long, dense hairs. Scutellum yellow. Wing clear, without dark patch. Face with a black middle line. Frontal lunule black. Hind tibiae with black ring after middle. The male genitalia and larva is figured by Dusek and Laska (1967).

Distribution
Palaearctic and Nearctic. Fennoscandia South to the Pyrenees. Ireland East to Central Europe and the Alps and Apennines (becomes increasingly montane toward southern parts of its range). Then European Russia and the Russian Far East, Siberia to the Pacific coast (Sakhalin and Kunashir islands) Also in the Himalayas (Nepal). In North America from Alaska to Mexico.

Biology
Habitat is Abies, Picea, Pinus forest. Arboreal, descending to visit flowers including yellow composites; white umbellifers, Bellis, Calluna vulgaris, Cardamine pratense, Cirsium vulgare, Crataegus, Epilobium angustifolium, Euphorbia hyberna, Geranium, Lonicera periclymenum, Prunus spinosa, Ranunculus, Rubus idaeus, Rubus fruticosus, Salix, Sorbus aucuparia, Stellaria, Veronica, Viburnum.
The flight period is May to July. The larvae feed on aphids.

References

Diptera of Europe
Syrphinae
Syrphini
Flies described in 1758
Taxa named by Carl Linnaeus